The Big Ka-Boom, Pt. 1 is the seventh spoken word album by Jello Biafra.

Recorded at a performance in November 2001 on Biafra's Spitfire Tour, the album consists of a single, 34-minute track discussing Biafra's views on the terrorist attacks of September 11, 2001 and subsequent "War on Terror". It was released on April 16, 2002, by Biafra's own Alternative Tentacles label.

Track listing

Personnel
Jello Biafra – producer, insert
Matt Kelley – editing
Marshall Lawless – producer
Jason Rosenberg – insert
John Yates – design

References

2002 albums
Alternative Tentacles live albums
Jello Biafra albums
Spoken word albums by American artists